Jill Rook (married name Mills), is a female former international table tennis and tennis player from England.

Table tennis career
She won a silver medal at the 1956 World Table Tennis Championships in the Corbillon Cup (women's team event) with Diane Rowe and Ann Haydon for England.

She also won a gold medal in the team event at the European Table Tennis Championships and won two English National Table Tennis Championships titles.

Tennis career
She appeared at the Wimbledon tennis championships from 1955 to 1965.

Personal life
She married Alan Mills in 1960.

See also
 List of England players at the World Team Table Tennis Championships
 List of World Table Tennis Championships medalists

References

English female table tennis players
1936 births
Living people
World Table Tennis Championships medalists
English female tennis players
British female tennis players